Paper is a 2010 Turkish comedy-drama film directed by Sinan Çetin, which tells the story of a young director trying to make his first film. Director won Best Director award in 12th Dhaka International Film Festival.

Plot 
Emrah is a dreamer who hopes to be a great director, trying to shoot his first feature film. His father Mehdi, a retired customs enforcement officer, believes that Emrah is going to become a pharmacist. Emrah manages to cobble together funding from producers with the help of his friends and his mother Şahane, but is held up by the bureaucracy. The main obstacle between him and his dreams is an endorsement letter he needs from Müzeyyen, the head of the censorship board. But this proves more difficult than he expected...

Standing up to authority in pursuit of his ideals, this young man finds himself entangled in a vehement struggle against this petty official who blindly enforces a senseless law.

Release

General release 

Festival screenings 
 47th Antalya "Golden Orange" International Film Festival (October 9–14, 2010)

Reception

Box office
The film has been in the Turkish national box office charts for two weeks and has made a total gross of US$103,964.

See also
 Turkish films of 2010-2011

References

External links
  (in Turkish)

2010 films
2010 black comedy films
2010s political comedy-drama films
Films set in Turkey
Turkish political films
Turkish comedy-drama films
Turkish black comedy films
2010 comedy films
2010s Turkish-language films